Agnes of Brunswick-Lüneburg (before 1356 – 1430/1434) was a Duchess of Brunswick-Lüneburg by birth and, by marriage, Duchess of Pomerania and later Duchess of Mecklenburg. She was the daughter of Duke Magnus II of Brunswick-Lüneburg (d. 1373) and Catharine of Anhalt-Bernburg (d. 1390).

In 1366 Agnes married Count Burkhard V (VIII) of Mansfeld (died 1389/1390).

Between 1389 and 1391, Agnes married a second time to Duke Bogislaw VI of Pomerania (d.1393) in Celle.

Agnes married a third time in Schwerin, on 12/13 February 1396 to the widowed former King Albert of Sweden, who at that time was Duke Albert III of Mecklenburg (b. c.1338 – d.1412). The couple had one son: Albert V (d.1423), who was Duke of Mecklenburg and Schwerin.

Agnes is not considered a Queen of Sweden, because Albert had definitely been deposed in Sweden before they were married, but in Mecklenburg she was regarded as titular queen, since Albert did not renounce his claims on Sweden until 1405.

Agnes died between 1 August 1430 and 22 December 1434 and was buried in Gadebusch.

References

Year of birth uncertain
Year of death uncertain
14th-century births
1430s deaths
Pomeranian nobility
14th-century German nobility
15th-century German nobility
House of Welf
Mecklenburgian nobility
14th-century German women
15th-century German women
Daughters of monarchs